Radio Wnet – Polish radio station and online social networking site, founded in 2009 by Krzysztof Skowroński, Grzegorz Wasowski, Katarzyna Adamiak-Sroczyńska, Monika Makowska-Wasowska, Wojciech Cejrowski and Jerzy Jachowicz.

Authors and collaborators 

The author of the name "Radio Wnet" is Grzegorz Wasowski. All the jingles were prepared by Monika and Grzegorz Wasowski. Also collaborated with Radio Wnet, including Marek Jurek, Janusz Korwin-Mikke, Marek Kamiński, Ludwik Dorn and Ewa Cybulska. From May to September 2011, on Saturdays and Sundays, Jerzy Kordowicz conducted his broadcasts under the name Synthesizer Carriers.

History 

 The first broadcast of Radio Wnet was broadcast on May 25, 2009 from Hotel Europejski in Warsaw, where the studio was located until February 15, 2013. The next studio addresses are ul. Koszykowa 8, where Radio Wnet broadcast until September 29, 2014, and then the PAST building at ul. Zielna 39.
 In November 2012, Radio Wnet released the album of rapper Tadek, Inconvenient Truth (Niewygodna prawda)
 In June 2013, Gazeta Wyborcza wrote that the station received PLN 140,000 from Law and Justice. Referring to this situation, Krzysztof Skowroński issued a statement on the website of the Association of Polish Journalists, of which he is the president. He stated that the values of the radio are: "freedom, openness and solidarity", and that the radio can work with those who share these values.
 On September 26, 2018, the Polish Broadcasting Council granted Radio Wnet frequencies to broadcast in Warsaw (87.8 MHz) and Krakow (95.2 MHz). The broadcast began in mid-October. 
On September 13, 2019, the radio was granted a frequency for broadcasting in Wroclaw (96.8 MHz), on October 11, 2019, was granted a frequency of 103.9 MHz for broadcasting in Bialystok, on September 24, 2019 the frequency for broadcasting in Szczecin (98.9 MHz) and on February 4, 2020 the frequency for broadcast in Bydgoszcz (104.4 MHz), Lublin (101.1 MHz) and Lodz (106.1 MHz)
In connection with the COVID-19 Pandemic in Poland, Radio Wnet on May 3, 2020 inaugurated a special action "Solidarity Radio Action" ("Solidarna Akcja Radiowa) consisting in supporting Polish companies and its entrepreneurs through a social campaign and advertising. The promotional campaign includes broadcasting of advertising spots on FM waves in Warsaw and Krakow and on www.wnet.fm. As part of this special charity action, every entrepreneur can receive a weekly campaign worth PLN 3,000. Currently, Radio WNET accepts applications for advertising campaigns that will be broadcast on June in the air. Two weeks after the start of Solidarity Radio Action received support from LOTOS Group. As part of the Radio Wnet campaign, it provides advertising time to Polish entrepreneurs worth over PLN 250,000. The action is extremely popular, already in the first days more than fifty entities came to it, filling up the May advertising blocks. This fact confirms that the action met with great interest

References

External links 
 Radio Wnet webpage

Radio stations in Poland
Mass media in Warsaw
Mass media in Kraków
Mass media in Wrocław
2009 establishments in Poland
Radio stations established in 2009